Joe Black is a compilation album by Florida death metal band Malevolent Creation. It was released on October 9, 1996 via Pavement Music. The first 2 songs on the album were originally written for the band "HatePlow" which mostly consisted of members of Malevolent Creation. There were plans for live recordings to be on the album after the first three songs but Phil Fasciana didn't like the live tapes he had at the time.

Track listing

References

Malevolent Creation compilation albums
1996 compilation albums